Simnia senegalensis is a species of sea snail, a marine gastropod mollusk in the family Ovulidae, the ovulids, cowry allies or false cowries.

Description

Distribution
This species occurs on the Atlantic coast of Africa (Cape Verde, Senegal, Gabon, Angola, São Tomé).

References

Ovulidae
Molluscs of the Atlantic Ocean
Invertebrates of Africa
Gastropods described in 1931